Oblivion EP is an EP by American heavy metal band Mastodon. It was released via the Internet on November 4, 2009, and is only for sale in digital format. The song "The Bit" is a Melvins cover.

Track listing

Credits
Brann Dailor − drums, vocals
Brent Hinds − guitar, vocals
Bill Kelliher − guitar
Troy Sanders − bass, vocals

References

Mastodon (band) albums
2009 EPs
Reprise Records EPs